Quercus trojana, the Macedonian oak is an oak in the turkey oak section 
(Quercus sect. Cerris).

Description
The acorns are 2–4 cm long when mature (about 18 months after pollination) and largely enclosed in the scaly acorn cup.

Fossil record
Fossils of Quercus trojana have been described from the fossil flora of Kızılcahamam district in Turkey, which is of early Pliocene age.

References

External links
 Quercus trojana - information, genetic conservation units and related resources. European Forest Genetic Resources Programme (EUFORGEN)

trojana
Flora of Southeastern Europe
Flora of Western Asia
Trees of Mediterranean climate
Plants described in 1839